Manuel A. Pérez (December 2, 1890 - May 7, 1951) was a Puerto Rican teacher and public service that made several contributions to various fields of the Public Administration during his career.

Biography
Manuel A. Pérez was born in the town of Comerío, Puerto Rico to Celestino Pérez and Josefa Pérez. He studied at his hometown and at the Industrial School at Puerta de Tierra.

From 1907 to 1909, he started working as an office employee at the Puerto Rico Leaf Tobacco Company, at Caguas.

He married Carlota Santiago Carmona with whom he had three children: Carlos Manuel, Irma, and Enrique.

In 1910, when he was 20 years old, he obtained his elementary school teacher certificate, and worked as such until 1912. He then went to continue studies in Public Health at the University of Puerto Rico.

From 1912 to 1924, he also dedicated time to agriculture, especially tobacco. One of his contributions was the organization and foundation of an Association for Agriculture Workers.

Thanks to a scholarship he received in 1929 from Johns Hopkins University, Pérez went to study to the University of Maryland, College Park.

In 1934, he was forced to interrupt his career in public service due to the death of his son. He returned to the United States where he lived for a year, before returning to work at Puerto Rico.

On May 7, 1951, Pérez died of a heart attack at the Presbyterian Hospital in San Juan, Puerto Rico.

Political career
Manuel Pérez served three times as an interim governor of Puerto Rico; once during the administration of Rexford Guy Tugwell, and twice during the administration of Jesús T. Piñero.

During one of his interim tenures, he approved the law that created the music schools of Puerto Rico.

Family
His oldest son, Carlos Manuel, died when he was studying at college. His daughter, Irma, married Dr. Dwight Santiago Stevenson. His youngest son, Enrique, received a doctorate in Medicine from the University of Maryland.

Legacy
There is a housing project in San Juan, Puerto Rico that bears the name of Manuel A. Pérez.

External links
Biography of Manuel A. Pérez

1890 births
1951 deaths
People from Comerío, Puerto Rico
Puerto Rican educators
University of Maryland, College Park alumni
20th-century Puerto Rican educators